Ipay, also known as 'Iipay or Northern Diegueño, is the Native American language spoken by the Kumeyaay people of central San Diego County, California. Hinton (1994:28) suggested a conservative estimate of 25 surviving Ipai speakers.

Ipai belongs to the Yuman language family and to the Delta–California branch of that family. Ipai and its neighbors to the south, Kumeyaay and Tipai, were often considered to be dialects of a single Diegueño language, but the current consensus among linguists seem to be that at least three distinct languages are present within the dialect chain (e.g., Langdon 1990). Confusingly, Kumeyaay is commonly used as a designation both for the central language in this family and for the Ipai-Kumeyaay-Tipai people as a whole.

Published documentation for the Ipai language includes reference and teaching grammars, a dictionary, and several texts (cf. Mithun 1999:578).

There is no standardized orthography for Ipai, and focus is put on pronunciation instead of notes.

Documentation 
A language revitalization effort for Santa Ysabel Iipaay Aa is underway. Classes are available through Kumeyaay Community College paired with Cuyamaca Community College. There is also a language immersion program.

Notes

References
 Couro, Ted and Christina Hutcheson.  1973.  Dictionary of Mesa Grande Diegueño;: 'Iipay Aa-English/English-'Iipay Aa, Malki Museum Press, California.
 Couro, Ted & Langdon, Margaret. 1975.  Let's talk 'Iipay Aa: An introduction to the Mesa Grande Diegueño language, Malki Museum Press, California.
 Hinton, Leanne. 1994. Flutes of Fire: Essays on California Indian Languages. Heyday Books, Berkeley, California.
 Langdon, Margaret. 1970. A Grammar of Diegueño: The Mesa Grande Dialect. University of California Press, Berkeley, California.
 Langdon, Margaret. 1990. "Diegueño: how many languages?" In Proceedings of the 1990 Hokan–Penutian Languages Workshop, edited by James E. Redden, pp. 184–190. University of Southern Illinois, Carbondale.
 Mithun, Marianne. 1999. The Languages of Native North America. Cambridge University Press.

External links
 Mesa Grande Ipai basic lexicon at the Global Lexicostatistical Database
 'Iipay Aa lessons and vocabulary

Kumeyaay
Indigenous languages of California
Yuman–Cochimí languages
Endangered indigenous languages of the Americas